The 2017–18 season is the 35th season in Segunda División played by Real Oviedo, a Spanish football club based in Oviedo, Asturias. It covers a period from 1 July 2017 to 30 June 2018.

Season overview

Pre-season

Players

Squad information

Transfers

In

Out

staff

Technical Staff

Medical Staff

Delegate and Material Manager

Pre-season and friendlies

Competitions

Segunda División

Results summary

Result round by round

Matches

Copa del Rey

Second round

Statistics

Squad statistics

 

|-
|colspan="12"|Players who have left the club after the start of the season:

Disciplinary record

|-
|colspan=14 align=left|Players who have left the club after the start of the season:

References

External links 

Real Oviedo
Real Oviedo seasons